This is a list of the governors of the province of Badghis, Afghanistan.

Governors of Badghis Province

See also
 List of current governors of Afghanistan

Notes

Badghis